The Clovis culture is a prehistoric Paleoamerican culture, named for distinct stone and bone tools found in close association with Pleistocene fauna, particularly two mammoths, at Blackwater Locality No. 1 near Clovis, New Mexico, in  1936 and 1937 (though Paleoindian artifacts had been found at the site since the 1920s). It existed from roughly 13,400–12,700 years ago near the end of the last glacial period, is characterized by the manufacture of "Clovis points" and distinctive bone and ivory tools, and it is represented by hundreds of sites, from which >10,000 Clovis points have been recovered.

The only human burial that has been directly associated with tools from the Clovis culture included the remains of an infant boy researchers named Anzick-1. Paleogenetic analyses of Anzick-1's ancient nuclear, mitochondrial, and Y-chromosome DNA reveal that Anzick-1 is closely related to some modern Native American populations (those in Southern North America, Central, and South America) and populations from Central Asia and Siberia.  This lends support to the Beringia or coastal Pacific hypotheses for the settlement of the Americas.

The Clovis culture was replaced by several more localized regional societies from the Younger Dryas cold-climate period onward. Post-Clovis cultures include the Folsom tradition, Gainey, Suwannee, Simpson, Plainview-Goshen, Cumberland, and Redstone. Each of these is thought to derive directly from Clovis, in some cases apparently differing only in the length of the fluting on their projectile points. Although this is generally held to be the result of normal cultural change through time, numerous other reasons have been suggested as driving forces to explain changes in the archaeological record, such as the Younger Dryas postglacial climate change, which exhibited numerous faunal extinctions.

After the discovery of several Clovis sites in eastern North America in the 1930s, the Clovis people came to be regarded as the first human inhabitants who created a widespread culture in the Americas and the ancestors of most of the indigenous peoples of the Americas. However, several archaeological discoveries have cast significant doubt on the Clovis-first theory, including sites such as Cactus Hill in Virginia, Paisley Caves in the Summer Lake Basin of Oregon, the Topper site in Allendale County South Carolina, Meadowcroft Rockshelter in Pennsylvania, the Friedkin site in Texas, Cueva Fell in Chile, White Sands site in New Mexico, and especially Monte Verde also in Chile. The oldest claimed human archaeological site in the Americas is the Pedra Furada hearths in Brazil, controversially dated to 19,000 to 30,000 years before the earliest Clovis sites.

Description

A hallmark of the toolkit associated with the Clovis culture is the distinctively shaped, fluted-stone spear point known as the Clovis point. The Clovis point is bifacial and typically fluted on both sides. Clovis tools were produced during a roughly 300-year period. Archaeologists do not agree on whether the widespread presence of these artifacts indicates the proliferation of a single people or the adoption of a superior technology by diverse population groups.

The culture is named after artifacts found between 1932 and 1936 at Blackwater Locality No. 1, an archaeological site between the towns of Clovis and Portales, New Mexico. These finds were deemed especially important due to their direct association with mammoth species and the extinct Bison antiquus.  The in situ finds of 1936 and 1937 included four stone Clovis points, two long bone points with impact damage, stone blades, a portion of a Clovis blade core, and several cutting tools made on stone flakes. Clovis sites have since been identified throughout much of the contiguous United States, as well as in Mexico and parts of Central America, and even into northern South America.

Clovis people are generally accepted to have hunted mammoths, as well as extinct bison, mastodon, gomphotheres, sloths, tapir, camelops, horse, and other smaller animals. More than 125 species of plants and animals are known to have been used by Clovis people in the portion of the Western Hemisphere they inhabited.

The oldest Clovis site in North America is believed to be El Fin del Mundo in northwestern Sonora, Mexico, discovered during a 2007 survey. It features occupation dating around 11,500 years Before Present. In 2011, remains of gomphotheres were found; the evidence suggests that humans killed two of them there. The Aubrey site in Denton County, Texas,  produced a radiocarbon date of 11,550 Before Present.

Disappearance of Clovis

The most commonly held perspective on the end of the Clovis culture is that a decline in the availability of megafauna, combined with an overall increase in a less mobile population, led to local differentiation of lithic and cultural traditions across the Americas. After this time, Clovis-style fluted points were replaced by other fluted-point traditions (such as the Folsom culture) with an essentially uninterrupted sequence across North and Central America. An effectively continuous cultural adaptation proceeds from the Clovis period through the ensuing Middle and Late Paleoindian periods.

Whether the Clovis culture drove the mammoth, and other species, to extinction via overhunting – the Pleistocene overkill hypothesis – is still an open, and controversial, theory. It has also been hypothesized that the Clovis culture experienced decline in the wake of the Younger Dryas cold phase. This "cold shock", lasting roughly 1,500 years, affected many parts of the world, including North America. This appears to have been triggered by a vast amount of meltwater – possibly from Lake Agassiz – emptying into the North Atlantic, disrupting the thermohaline circulation.

The Younger Dryas Impact hypothesis, or Clovis Comet hypothesis, originally proposed that a large air burst or earth impact from a comet or comets initiated the Younger Dryas cold period about 12,900 years ago (10,900 14C years ago). This hypothesis has been largely contradicted, with research showing that most of the original findings cannot be replicated by other scientists. This hypothesis is criticized because of its misinterpretation of data and the lack of confirmatory evidence.

However, proponents of the hypothesis have responded, disputing the accusation of irreproducibility of their findings. In 2013, a group from Harvard reported finding a layer of increased platinum (Pt) composition exactly at the Younger Dryas onset in a Greenland ice core, followed in 2017 by a report that the Pt spike had been also been found at an additional 11 continental Younger Dryas sites.

Discovery

On 29 August 1927, the first in place evidence of Pleistocene humans seen by multiple archaeologists in the Americas was discovered near Folsom, New Mexico.  At this site they found the first in situ Folsom point with the extinct B. antiquus bones. This confirmation of a human presence in the Americas during the Pleistocene inspired many people to start looking for evidence of early humans. Another earlier example at Folsom was discovered by George McJunkin, a cowboy, who found an ancient bison (Bison antiquus, an extinct relative of the American bison) skeleton in 1908 after a flash flood. The site was first excavated in 1926 under the direction of Harold Cook and Jesse Figgins.

In 1929, 19-year-old Ridgely Whiteman, who had been closely following the excavations in nearby Folsom in the newspaper, discovered the Clovis site near the Blackwater Draw in eastern New Mexico. Despite several earlier Paleoindian discoveries, the best documented evidence of the Clovis complex was collected and excavated between 1932 and 1937 near Clovis, New Mexico, by a crew under the direction of Edgar Billings Howard until 1935 and later by John Cotter from the Academy of Natural Sciences/University of Pennsylvania. Howard's crew left their excavation in Burnet Cave, New Mexico,
(the first truly professionally excavated Clovis site) in August, 1932, and visited Whiteman and his Blackwater Draw site. By November, Howard was back at Blackwater Draw to investigate additional finds from a construction project.

The American Journal of Archaeology (January–March, 1932 V36 #1) in its "Archaeological Notes" mentions E. B. Howard's work in Burnet Cave, including the discovery of extinct fauna and a "Folsom type" point 4 ft below a Basketmaker burial. This brief mention of the Clovis point found in place predates any work done at the Dent site in Colorado. The reference is made to a slightly earlier article on Burnet Cave in The University Museum Bulletin of November, 1931.

The first report of professional work at the Blackwater Draw Clovis site was published in the November 25th issue of Science News (V22 #601) in 1932. The publications on Burnet Cave and Blackwater Draw directly contradict statements by several authors (for example see Haynes 2002:56 The Early Settlement of North America) that Dent, Colorado was the first excavated Clovis site. The Dent site, in Weld County, Colorado, was simply a fossil mammoth excavation in 1932. The first Dent Clovis point was found on November 5, 1932, and the in situ point was found July 7, 1933. The in situ Clovis point from Burnet Cave was excavated in late August, 1931 (and was reported in early 1932).

A Clovis burial site was found in Montana in 1968. It contained the remains of a two-year-old child known as Anzick-1 or the Anzick boy. Analysis of DNA recovered from the remains indicates that Anzick-1 is more closely related to all of the indigenous peoples of the Americas than to any other group.

Clovis Paleo-Indians

Available genetic data show that the Clovis people are the direct ancestors of roughly 80% of all living Native American populations in North and South America, with the remainder descended from ancestors who entered in later waves of migration. As reported in February 2014, DNA from the 12,600-year-old remains of Anzick boy, found in Montana, has affirmed this connection to the peoples of the Americas. In addition, this DNA analysis affirmed genetic connections back to ancestral peoples of northeast Asia. This adds weight to the theory that peoples migrated across a land bridge from Siberia to North America.

Clovis First

This theory, known as "Clovis First", had been the predominant hypothesis among archaeologists in the second half of the 20th century. According to Clovis First, the people associated with the Clovis culture were the first inhabitants of the Americas. The primary support for this claim was that no solid evidence of pre-Clovis human habitation had been found. According to the standard accepted theory, the Clovis people crossed the Beringia land bridge over the Bering Strait from Siberia to Alaska during the ice age when there was a period of lowered sea levels, then made their way southward through an ice-free corridor east of the Rocky Mountains, located in present-day Western Canada, as the glaciers retreated.

This hypothesis came to be challenged by ongoing studies that suggest pre-Clovis human occupation of the Americas. In 2011, following the excavation of an occupation site at Buttermilk Creek, Texas, a group of scientists identified the existence "of an occupation older than Clovis." At the site in Buttermilk, archaeologists discovered evidence of hunter-gatherer group living and the making of projectile spear points, blades, choppers, and other stone tools. The tools found were made from a local chert and could be dated back to as early as 15,000 years ago.

According to researchers Michael Waters and Thomas Stafford of Texas A&M University, new radiocarbon dates place Clovis remains from the continental United States in a shorter time window beginning 450 years later than the previously accepted threshold (13,200 to 12,900 BP).

Recently, the scientific consensus has changed to acknowledge the presence of pre-Clovis cultures in the Americas, ending the "Clovis first" consensus.

Alternatives to Clovis First

Evidence of human habitation before Clovis

There have been a great number of archaeological findings across the Americas that date the arrival of humans to the Americas as prior to 11,500–11,000 uncalibrated years before present (YBP). The Buttermilk Creek Complex, located in Salado, Texas, is a site where over 15,000 artifacts have been found. These artifacts are composed of a variety of small stone tool assemblages. These artifacts stratigraphically underlie previously excavated Clovis assemblages, meaning that they were deposited prior to the Clovis artifacts. These pre-Clovis assemblages are dated to between 13,200 and 15,500 years ago.

Predecessors of the Clovis people may have migrated south along the North American coastlines, although arguments exist for many migrations along several different routes. Radiocarbon dating of the Monte Verde site in Chile places Clovis-like culture there as early as 18,500 to 14,500 years ago. Remains found at the Channel Islands of California place coastal Paleoindians there 12,500 years ago. This suggests that the Paleoindian migration could have spread more quickly along the Pacific coastline, proceeding south, and that populations that settled along that route could have then begun migrations eastward into the continent.

The Pedra Furada sites in Brazil include a collection of rock shelters, which were used for thousands of years by diverse human populations. The first excavations yielded artifacts with carbon-14 dates of 48,000 to 32,000 years BP. Repeated analyses have confirmed this dating, carrying the range of dates up to 60,000 BP. The best-analyzed archaeological levels are dated between 32,160 ± 1000 years BP and 17,000 ± 400 BP. These claims have become an issue of contention between North American archaeologists and their South American and European counterparts, who disagree on whether it is conclusively proven to be an older human site.

In 2004, worked stone tools were found at Topper in South Carolina that have been dated by radiocarbon techniques possibly to 50,000 years ago. But, there is significant scholarly dispute regarding these dates. Scholars agree that evidence of humans at the Topper Site date back to 22,900 cal yr BP.

A more substantiated claim is that of Paisley Caves, Oregon, where rigorous carbon-14 and genetic testing appear to indicate that humans related to modern Native Americans were present in the caves over 1000 14C years before the earliest evidence of Clovis. Traces and tools made by another people, the "Western Stemmed" tradition, were documented.
 
A study published in Science presents strong evidence that humans occupied sites in Monte Verde, Chile, at the tip of South America, as early as 13,000 years ago. If this is true, then humans must have entered North America long before the Clovis culture – perhaps 16,000 years ago.

The Tlapacoya site in Mexico is located along the base of a volcanic (remnant) hill on the shore of the former Lake Chalco. Seventeen excavations along the base of Tlapacoya Hill between 1956 and 1973 uncovered piles of disarticulated bones of bear and deer that appeared to have been butchered, plus 2,500 flakes and blades presumably from the butchering activities, plus one unfluted spear point. All were found in the same stratum containing three circular hearths filled with charcoal and ash. Bones of many other animal species were also present, including horses and migratory waterfowl. Two uncalibrated radiocarbon dates on carbon from the hearths came in around 24,000 and 22,000 years ago. At another location, a prismatic microblade of obsidian was found in association with a tree trunk radiocarbon dated (uncalibrated) at roughly 24,000 years ago. This obsidian blade has recently been hydration dated by Joaquín García-Bárcena to 22,000 years ago. The hydration results were published in a seminal article that deals with the evidence for pre-Clovis habitation of Mexico.

Other sites, like White Sands National Park, located in New Mexico, also demonstrate archaeological findings that predate Clovis populations. In White Sands, excavated surfaces uncovered multiple in situ human footprints that were stratigraphically located between layers of material that were radio carbon dated to be from between 21,000 and 23,000 years ago. The findings from this site predate previous theories about the timeline of human migration of the Americas by several thousand years. Archaeologist working on the site believe that their findings indicates that humans had been present in the region since 23,000 years prior. This would mean that humans were occupying North America during the Last Glacial Maximum (LGM) – a theory that had previously been dismissed.

Though it is not currently the "widely-accepted theory", these archaeological sites point support alternative theories of early human migration such as a coastal migration route or the Solutrean hypothesis. This archaeological evidence is also supported by genetic mapping of ancestral mitochondrial DNA.

Archaeological sites that predate Clovis that are well documented include:
 White Sands National Park, New Mexico, USA; (21,000-23,000 BP)
 Topper, South Carolina, US (16,000–20,000 yr BP; possibly 50,000 yr BP)
 Saltville (archaeological site), Virginia, US (14,510 14C yr BP)
 Manis Mastodon site, Sequim, Washington, US (13,800 yr BP)
 Connley Caves, Oregon, US (13,000 yr BP)
 Lapa do Boquete, Brazil (12,070 ±170 14C yr BP)
 Tanana Valley, Alaska, US (13,000–14,000 cal yr BP)
 El Abra, Colombia (12,460 ±140 14C yr BP)
 Nenana Valley, Alaska, US (12,000 yr BP)
 Tibitó, Colombia (11,740 ±110 14C yr BP)
 Tagua-Tagua, Chile (11,380 ±380 14C yr BP)

Coastal migration route
Studies of the mitochondrial DNA of First Nations/Native Americans published in 2007 suggest that the people of the New World may have diverged genetically from Siberians as early as 20,000 years ago, far earlier than the standard theory suggests. According to one alternative theory, the Pacific coast of North America may have been free of ice, allowing the first peoples in North America to come down this route prior to the formation of the ice-free corridor in the continental interior. No evidence has yet been found to support this hypothesis except that genetic analysis of coastal marine life indicates diverse fauna persisting in refugia throughout the Pleistocene ice ages along the coasts of Alaska and British Columbia; these refugia include common food sources of coastal aboriginal peoples, suggesting that a migration along the coastline was feasible at the time. Some early sites on the coast, for example Namu, British Columbia, exhibit maritime focus on foods from an early point with substantial cultural continuity.

This lack of evidence is likely due to the change in sea level since the time of migration. During the Last Glacial Maximum the global sea level was more than 400 feet lower than it is today. Starting about 15,000 years ago, glaciers began retreating and sea levels began rising. Sea levels reached their current level about 8,000 years ago and have fluctuated slightly since then. This drastic change in sea level may prevent the discovery of sites located along what was once the coastline and is now located under over 400 feet of water. As of now, genetic analysis is one of the only means of tracking early human movements.

In February 2014, researchers reported on their DNA analysis of the remains of Anzick boy (referred to as Anzick-1) of Montana, the oldest skeleton found in the Americas and dated to 12,600 years ago. They found the mtDNA to be D4h3a, "one of the rare lineages associated with Native Americans." This was the same as the mtDNA associated with current coastal populations in North and South America. The study team suggest that finding this genetic evidence so far inland shows that "current distribution of genetic markers are not necessarily indicative of the movement or distribution of peoples in the past." The Y haplotype was found to be Q-L54*(xM3). Further testing found that Anzick-1 was most closely related to Native American populations (see below).

Solutrean hypothesis

The controversial Solutrean hypothesis proposed in 1999 by Smithsonian archaeologist Dennis Stanford and colleague Bruce Bradley (Stanford and Bradley 2002), suggests that the Clovis people could have inherited technology from the Solutrean people who lived in southern Europe 21,000–15,000 years ago, and who created the first Stone Age artwork in present-day southern France. The link is suggested by the similarity in technology between the projectile points of the Solutreans and those found at Clovis (and pre-Clovis) sites. Its proponents point to tools found at various pre-Clovis sites in eastern North America (particularly in the Chesapeake Bay region) as progenitors of Clovis-style tools. The model envisions these people making the crossing in small watercraft via the edge of the pack ice in the North Atlantic Ocean that then extended to the Atlantic coast of France, using skills similar to those of the modern Inuit, making landfall somewhere around the then-exposed Grand Banks of the North American continental shelf.

In a 2008 study of the relevant paleoceanographic data, Kieran Westley and Justin Dix concluded that "it is clear from the paleoceanographic and paleo-environmental data that the Last Glacial Maximum (LGM) North Atlantic does not fit the descriptions provided by the proponents of the Solutrean Atlantic Hypothesis. Although ice use and sea mammal hunting may have been important in other contexts, in this instance, the conditions militate against an ice-edge-following, maritime-adapted European population reaching the Americas."

University of New Mexico anthropologist Lawrence G. Straus, a primary critic of the Solutrean hypothesis, points to the theoretical difficulty of the ocean crossing, a lack of Solutrean-specific features in pre-Clovis artifacts, as well as the lack of art (such as that found at Lascaux in France) among the Clovis people, as major deficiencies in the Solutrean hypothesis. The 3,000 to 5,000 radiocarbon year gap between the Solutrean period of France and Spain and the Clovis of the New World also makes such a connection problematic. In response, Bradley and Stanford contend that it was "a very specific subset of the Solutrean who formed the parent group that adapted to a maritime environment and eventually made it across the north Atlantic ice-front to colonize the east coast of the Americas" and that this group may not have shared all Solutrean cultural traits.

Genetic evidence of east/west dichotomy

Mitochondrial DNA analysis in 2014 found that members of some native North American tribes have a maternal ancestry (called haplogroup X) linked to the maternal ancestors of some present-day individuals in western Asia and Europe, albeit distantly. This has also provided some support for pre-Clovis models. More specifically, a variant of mitochondrial DNA called X2a found in many Native Americans has been traced to western Eurasia, while not being found in eastern Eurasia.

Mitochondrial DNA analysis of Anzick-1 concluded that the boy belonged to what is known as haplogroup or lineage D4h3a. This finding is important because the D4h3a line is considered to be a lineage "founder", belonging to the first people to reach the Americas. Although rare in most of today's Native Americans in the US and Canada, D4h3a genes are more common among native peoples of South America, far from the site in Montana where Anzick-1 was buried. This suggests a greater genetic complexity among Native Americans than previously thought, including an early divergence in the genetic lineage 13,000 years ago. One theory suggests that after crossing into North America from Siberia, a group of the first Americans, with the lineage D4h3a, moved south along the Pacific coast and, over thousands of years, into Central and South America, while others may have moved inland, east of the Rocky Mountains. The apparent early divergence between North American and Central plus South American populations may or may not be associated with post-divergence gene flow from a more basal population into North America; however, analysis of published DNA sequences for 19 Siberian populations does not favor the latter scenario.

Spearheads and DNA found at the Paisley Caves site in Oregon suggest that North America was colonized by more than one culture, and that the Clovis culture was not the first. There is evidence to suggest an east/west dichotomy, with the Clovis culture located to the east.

But in 2014, the autosomal DNA of a 12,500+-year-old infant from Montana was sequenced. The DNA was taken from a skeleton referred to as Anzick-1, found in close association with several Clovis artifacts. Comparisons indicate strong affinities with DNA from Siberian sites, and virtually rule out close affinity with European sources (the "Solutrean hypothesis"). The DNA shows strong affinities with all existing Native American populations, which indicated that each of them derives from an ancient population that lived in or near Siberia, the Upper Palaeolithic Mal'ta population. Mal'ta belonged to Y-DNA haplogroup R and mitochrondrial macrohaplogroup U.

The data indicate that Anzick-1 is from a population directly ancestral to present South American and Central American Native American populations. This rules out hypotheses which posit that invasions subsequent to the Clovis culture overwhelmed or assimilated previous migrants into the Americas. Anzick-1 is less closely related to present North American Native American populations (including a Yaqui genetic sample), suggesting that the North American populations are basal to Anzick-1 and Central and South American populations. The apparent early divergence between North American and Central plus South American populations might be due to post-divergence gene flow from a more basal population into North America; however, analysis of published DNA sequences of 19 Siberian populations do not suggest this scenario. Anzick-1 belonged to Y-haplogroup Q-L54(xM3), which is by far the largest haplogroup among Native Americans.

The issue is complicated by the discovery that there was DNA backflow from North America to North Asia during the period in question.

Megafaunal migrations 
Although there is no archaeological evidence that can be used to directly support a coastal migration route during the Last Glacial Maximum, genetic analysis has been used to support this thesis. In addition to human genetic lineage, megafaunal DNA linage can be used to trace movements of megafauna – large mammalian – as well as the early human groups who hunted them.

Bison, a type of megafauna, have been identified as an ideal candidate for the tracing of human migrations out of Europe because of both their abundance in North America as well as being one of the first megafauna for which ancient DNA was used to trace patterns of population movement. Unlike other types of fauna that moved between the Americas and Eurasia (mammoths, horses, and lions), Bison survived the North American extinction event that occurred at the end of the Pleistocene. Their genome, however, contains evidence of a bottleneck – something that can be used to test hypothesis on migrations between the two continents. Early human groups were largely nomadic, relying on following food sources for survival. Mobility was part of what made humans successful. As nomadic groups, early humans likely followed the food from Eurasia to the Americas – part of the reason why tracing megafaunal DNA is so helpful for garnering insight to these migratory patterns.

The grey wolf originated in the Americas and migrated into Eurasia prior to the Last Glacial Maximum – during which it was believed that remaining populations of the grey wolf residing in North America faced extinction and were isolated from the rest of the population. This, however, may not be the case. Radiocarbon dating of ancient grey wolf remains found in permafrost deposits in Alaska show a continuous exchange of population from 12,500 radiocarbon years BP to beyond radiocarbon dating capabilities. This indicates that there was viable passage for grey wolf populations to exchange between the two continents.

These faunas' ability to exchange populations during the period of the Last Glacial Maximum along with genetic evidence found from early human remains in the Americas provides evidence to support pre-Clovis migrations into the Americas.

Other sites

In approximate reverse chronological order:
 Pedra Furada, Serra da Capivara National Park, in the state of Piauí, Brazil. Site with evidence of non-Clovis human remains, a rock painting rupestre art drawings from at least 12,000–6,000 BP. Hearth samples C-14 dates of 48–32,000 BP were reported in a Nature article (Guidon and Delibrias 1986). New hearth samples with ABOX dates of 54,000 BP were reported in the Quaternary Science Reviews. Paleoindian components found here, have been challenged by American researchers such as Meltzer, Adovasio, and Dillehay. 
The Monte Verde site in Chile, was occupied from 14,800 years BP, with bones and other finds dating on average 12,500 yrs BP. The earliest finds at the site were from between 32,840 and 33,900 years BP, but are controversial. 14C yr BP)
The Bluefish Caves site in Yukon, Canada, contains bones with evidence of human cut-marks which demonstrates a human presence as early as 24,000 yr BP. The Bluefish caves are currently the oldest archaeological site in North America and offers evidence regarding the Beringia Standstill hypothesis, which states a genetically isolated human population remained in the area during the last glacial maximum and then traveled within North America and South America after the glaciers receded.
 Lagoa Santa, Minas Gerais, Brazil, is erroneously asserted to be Clovis age or even possibly Pre-Clovis in age. The recent discussion of this site (specifically Lapa Vermelha IV) and the Luzia skull, reportedly 11,500 years old by Neves and Hubb, makes it clear that this date is a chronological date in years Before Present and not a raw radiocarbon date in eastern Brazil. Clovis sites mostly date between 11,500 and 11,000 radiocarbon years which means 13,000 years before present at a minimum.  "Luzia" is at least 1,000 years younger than Clovis and Lapa Vermelha IV should not be considered a Pre-Clovis site.
 Cueva del Milodón, in Patagonian Chile dates at least as early as 10,500 BP. This is a site found particularly early in the New World hunt for Early Man, circa 1896, and needs additional basic research, but 10,500 B.P. would be 1,500 years younger than Clovis, or if the dating is 10,500 RCYBP [radiocarbon years before present], it would still be roughly 500–700 years younger than Clovis. In either case this should not be considered a Pre-Clovis site.
 Cueva Fell and Pali Aike Crater sites in Patagonia, with hearths, stone tools and other elements of human habitation dating to at least as early as 11,000 BP.
The Big Eddy Site in southwestern Missouri contains several claimed pre-Clovis artifacts or geofacts. In situ artifacts have been found in this well-stratified site in association with charcoal. Five different samples have been AMS dated to between 11,300 and 12,675 BP (Before Present).
Taima Taima, Venezuela has cultural material very similar to Monte Verde II, dating to 12,000 years BP. Recovered artifacts of the El Jobo complex in direct association with the butchered remains of a juvenile mastodon. Radiocarbon dates on associated wood twigs indicate a minimum age of 13,000 years before the present for the mastodon kill, a dating significantly older than that of the Clovis complex in North America.
 The Page–Ladson site, on the Aucilla River in Florida, has yielded evidence that a mastodon was butchered by people 15,550 calendar years BP. A cut mastodon tusk dated to 12,300 years BP had previously been found near a few in situ artifacts of similar age. A test pit in 1983 yielded elephant bones, bone tools, and chips from tool making. Radiocarbon dating of organic material from the pit yielded dates from 13,000 to 11,700 years BP.
 The Schaefer and Hebior mammoth sites in Kenosha County, Wisconsin indicate exploitation of this animal by humans. The Schaefer Mammoth site has over 13 highly purified collagen AMS dates and 17 dates on associated wood, dating it to 12,300–12,500 radiocarbon years before the present. Hebior has two AMS dates in the same range. Both animals show conclusive butchering marks and associated non-diagnostic tools.
 A site in Walker, Minnesota with stone tools, alleged to be from 13,000 to 15,000 years old based on surrounding geology, was discovered in 2006. However, further examination suggests that the site does not represent a human occupation.
 In a 2011 article in Science, Waters et al. 2011 describe an assemblage of 15,528 lithic artifacts from the Debra L. Friedkin site west of Salado, Texas. These artifacts (including 56 tools, 2,268 macrodebitage and 13,204 microdebitage) define the Buttermilk Creek Complex formation, which stratigraphically underlies a Clovis assemblage. While carbon dating could not be used to directly date the artifacts, 49 samples from the 20 cm Buttermilk floodplain sedimentary clay layer in which the artifacts were embedded were dated using optically stimulated luminescence (OSL). Eighteen OSL ages, ranging from 14,000 to 17,500 ka were obtained from this layer. The authors report "the most conservative estimate" of the age of the Buttermilk clays range from 13,200 to 15,500 ka, based on the minimum age represented by each of the 18 OSL ages.
 Human coprolites have been found in Paisley Caves in Oregon, carbon dated at 14,300 years ago. Genetic analysis revealed that the coprolites contained mtDNA haplogroups A2 and B2, two of the five major Native American mtDNA haplogroups.
 The Mud Lake site, in Kenosha County, Wisconsin consists of the foreleg of a juvenile mammoth recovered in the 1930s. Over 100 stone tool butchering marks are found on the bones. Several purified collagen AMS dates show the animal to be 13,450 RCYBP with a range of plus or minus 1,500 RCYBP variance.
Meadowcroft Rockshelter in southwestern Pennsylvania, excavated 1973–78, with evidence of occupancy dating back from 16,000 to 19,000 years ago.
Cactus Hill in southern Virginia, with artifacts such as unfluted bifacial stone tools with dates ranging from c. 15,000 to 17,000 years ago.
Sixty-eight stone and bone tools discovered in an orchard in East Wenatchee, Washington in 1987, excavated in 1988 and 1990. Five of the Clovis points are on display at the Wenatchee Valley Museum & Cultural Center.
Serpentine Hot Springs in the Seward Peninsula, Alaska, excavated 2010–2011, with evidence of what appears to have been a backflow in migration of Clovis people who may have moved north through the ice-free corridor to settle in Western Alaska on the Bering Sea. The spear points found were a modification of Clovis, either from a northward migration or of the adoption of the technology by indigenous inhabitants.
Pendejo Cave is a geological feature and archaeological site located in southern New Mexico. Archaeologist Richard S. MacNeish claimed that human occupation of the cave pre-dates by tens of thousands of years the Clovis Culture.
The Cerutti Mastodon site is a paleontological and possible archeological site located in San Diego County, California. In 2017, researchers announced that broken mastodon bones at the site had been dated to around 130,700 years ago. Others have disputed the claim that humans had modified the cobbles found at the site or had broken the bones.

See also
Archaeology of the Americas
 First Nations
History of Mesoamerica (Paleo-Indian)
List of archaeological periods (Mesoamerica)
List of archaeological periods (North America)
Naco-Mammoth Kill Site
Cooper's Ferry site

References

Further reading

External links

Early human migration to Americas linked to climate change - Phys.org February 6, 2023
Picture Gallery of the Paleolithic (reconstructional palaeoethnology), Libor Balák at the Czech Academy of Sciences, the Institute of Archaeology in Brno, The Center for Paleolithic and Paleoethnological Research
New evidence suggests Stone Age hunters from Europe discovered America – by David Keys 28 February 2012
Stone Age Columbus – BBC TV programme summary.
Texas Beyond History

 
Archaeological cultures of North America
Archaeology of the United States
Archaeology of Mexico
Hunter-gatherers of the United States
Paleo-Indian period
Pre-Columbian cultures
Prehistoric cultures in Colorado
11th millennium BC
1929 archaeological discoveries
Upper Paleolithic cultures